Vice presidential elections were held in Guatemala on 14 May 2015. Baldetti resigned from her post as vice president on May 8, 2015, after a U.N. anti-corruption investigation arrested 24 individuals, including her personal secretary Juan Carlos Monzón Rojas, for involvement in an import bribery scheme known as La Línea (the Line) in which officials received bribes to reduce duties paid by importers.  Baldetti was detained on fraud charges on August 21, 2015, while at the hospital. Reportedly, wiretaps of those implicated in the scandals appears to refer to her involvement with references to "the R", "the No.2" and "the lady." Her arrest was followed by allegations by prosecutor Thelma Aldana against President Molina, and protests calling for his resignation.

Maldonado was elected Vice President by Congress on May 14, 2015, after his predecessor, Roxana Baldetti, resigned amid allegations of corruption. Before becoming vice president, he served as a constitutional judge, congressional deputy, ambassador to the United Nations, and political leader, including a failed presidential bid in 1982. He was Minister of Education from 1970 to 1974 and Minister of Foreign Affairs from 1995 to 1996.

Candidates 
Alejandro Maldonado: Magistrate of the Constitutional Court since 1986.
Adela Camacho de Torrebiarte: Commissioner for Police Reform since 2012.
Adrián Zapata: Presidential Commissioner for Integral Rural Development since 2012.

Results

References

2015 elections in Central America
Elections in Guatemala
2015 in Guatemala
Vice presidential elections